Tritemnodon ("three cutting teeth") was a genus of hyaeanodontids that lived during the early Eocene. Fossils of Tritemnodon agilis have been found in Utah and Wyoming (Willwood Formation of Big Horn County and the Lower Bridger Formation of Uinta County), and it was the size of a wolf.

Phylogeny
The phylogenetic relationships of genus Tritemnodon are shown in the following cladogram.

References

Hyaenodonts
Eocene mammals of North America
Prehistoric placental genera